The Ames Schoolhouse is a historic school building at 450 Washington Street in Dedham, Massachusetts. It was originally part of the Dedham Public Schools. It currently serves as the town hall and senior center for the Town of Dedham.

The Colonial Revival structure was built in 1897. It was named in honor of American Revolution-era politician Fisher Ames. It is a large H-shaped building, with a central section flanked by symmetrical projecting bays on either side. It has a hip roof with a deep dentillated eave, and pilastered corners. The main entrance is set under broad arch at the center, with a Palladian window above.  Above the front door is the following inscription:
1644 AMES SCHOOL 1897
Named in honor of Fisher Ames. A native of Dedham, 
a wise statesman. And a friend of Washington. "With a 
united government well administered, we have nothing to
fear and without it nothing to hope."

The building was dedicated in June 1898. On the first floor, in addition to the master's room and teachers' room, were eight classrooms. Each classroom was 28' by 36' and was designed for 56 students. At the southern end of the second floor were four classrooms, the library, and a chemical lab. The northern end housed the main hall with a stage and two dressing rooms.

In 1937, it was painted and renovated by the Works Progress Administration. The building was listed on the National Register of Historic Places in 1983 and sold in the same year. It was an office building for the next three decades. 

At the 2014 Spring Annual Town Meeting, the Town of Dedham voted to repurchase the building for $5.85 million and renovate it to be used as a Town Hall and Senior Center. The project was long overdue and over budget. On June 19 and 20, 2020, most departments moved from the old town hall into the Ames Schoolhouse. The annual town election was delayed in 2020 due to the COVID-19 pandemic, and so the Town Clerk's office remained at the old town hall until the end of June.

The senior center portion of the building includes an outdoor patio, arts and crafts room, fitness center, media room, lounge, and more.

See also
National Register of Historic Places listings in Norfolk County, Massachusetts

Notes

References

Works cited

Schoolhouses in Massachusetts
School buildings completed in 1898
School buildings on the National Register of Historic Places in Massachusetts
Shingle Style architecture in Massachusetts
Schools in Dedham, Massachusetts
National Register of Historic Places in Norfolk County, Massachusetts
Town halls in Massachusetts